Kalamata is a city on the Peloponnese peninsula in southern Greece.

Kalamata may also refer to:

Kalamata olive, a cultivar of olive
Kalamata International Airport, an airport in Kalamata
Kalamata F.C., professional football club
Kalamata Municipal Stadium, sports arena in Kalamata
Fort Kalamata, fort on the island of Ternate in Maluku Islands, Indonesia

See also